Yamanam is a 1992 Malayalam film, directed by Bharath Gopi, and starring Archana, Santha Devi, Syama and Nedumudi Venu.

Plot
A physically disabled girl Ambili (Archana) is restricted to a wheelchair because of a childhood attack of polio. Unable to move out of home, she has only to fantasize the exteriors. She turns terribly introvert, fathoming the truth within and becoming positive towards people. She is skilled at making models and toys. She and her widowed mother are gradually sidelined in their own home by her brother Devan and his wife Raji.
She and her mother feel isolated when her brother and wife leaves home. Then one of the house models made by Ambili is sold for a good sum, and she becomes more energetic about her work. 
A doctor proposes to marry Ambili, but she refuses because of the realization that his feeling are only based on sympathy.

Awards
The film won the following awards:

 National Film Awards – 1992
 Best Film on Other Social Issues
 Best Supporting Actress – Santha Devi

 Kerala State Film Awards - 1991
 Best Background Music - G.Devarajan

Cast
Archana
Ramachandran
Santha Devi
Nedumudi Venu
Syama

References 

1992 films
1990s Malayalam-language films
Films featuring a Best Supporting Actress National Film Award-winning performance
Best Film on Other Social Issues National Film Award winners